ORAZI (who wrote his name in capital letters), was born in 1906 and died in 1979. He was a painter of the French School (École Française), mentioned as a member of the School of Paris (École de Paris or nouvelle École de Paris).

He regularly participated in different artistic groups in Paris. His works evolved from figurative art to abstract art, which was often characterised by matter in relief rising from the canvas surface. He called this phase: Painture en Relief (Painting in Relief). He returned to figurative painting in his latest phase.

In Paris, he set up his studio (his atelier) in Boulevard du Montparnasse since 1934. At time, the district of Montparnasse had replaced Montmartre as the artistic centre of Paris. After the Second World War, in 1946–1947, he moved to another atelier - in a quiet street of Montparnasse - and he maintained the same address until his death.

He steadily exhibited his works, for over three decades from 1947 until the year of his death, at the Salon de Mai, of which he became a “historic member”: this was the art association founded in Paris in 1943 (declared in 1944) in opposition to Nazi ideology, whose annual exhibitions were an important artistic event from 1945 onwards. In the introductory note to the 1979 Catalogue of the Salon de Mai, “La volonté de Continuer” (the will to continue), his death was remembered by Gaston Diehl, Founding President, with these words: “I care to remember those who have recently left us [...] and most especially two painters who were for so long faithful companions in our artistic path: ORAZI and BURTIN.”.

In 1952 he was appointed member (Sociétaire), for the Painting Section, of the Salon d'Automne Society, the Parisian art institution founded in 1903 with the aim to encourage the development of the fine arts and organize the annual art exhibition the Salon d'Automne.

Throughout his career, from 1932 until his death in 1979, he participated in a long series of exhibitions, including many solo exhibitions, mostly in Paris, but also elsewhere in France, Italy and Europe, America, and Japan. There have also been some solo exhibitions after his death, from 1980 to 2006.

Subsequently, in 2009, the American photographer and artist Peter Beard reproduced four paintings by ORAZI - from his Peintures en Relief   (Paintings in Relief)<ref>The pictures of these paintings are on line: http://www.painter-in-paris.com, Home Page.</ref> - in the Pirelli Calendar.

The name he adopted along his artistic career was ORAZI (pron. ORASI'), deriving from the Roman antiquity and represented in the artistic field - since the 17th century - by a series of artists of the same family tree, active in France but who were originally from the Bologna area and central Italy.

 Education, first artistic phase 

From his early youth, even before completing his Classical studies, in particular in the fields of literature, philosophy and history, ancient Greek and Roman aesthetics, ORAZI devoted himself to the study of painting and painting techniques. For many years he also studied piano. When he was about sixteen he had already found his true calling. Painting would become his vocation and passion

ORAZI was always travelling in search of new artistic experiences. 
Towards the end of the 1920s he was in Venice. He was well integrated in that artistic milieu; Leonardo Dudreville considered him as a pupil, in 1927 drew a portrait of him, and in 1934, when ORAZI had his first solo exhibition, held at the art gallery ‘Pesaro’, Dudreville wrote the foreword to the catalogue.

In Paris, ORAZI participated in the intellectual life which saw the district of Montparnasse, from the Twenties onwards, as the meeting place as well as the starting point of new artistic theories and experiences. 
In 1937 the Parisian art gallery ‘Galerie de Paris’ organised his solo exhibition. In 1937 and 1938, he exhibited at the First and Second Salon des Jeunes Artistes in Paris.

He was again in Italy. His paintings (Paulette; Wally; Young woman dressed in blue) were exhibited in 1934 and 1936 at the ‘Esposizione Internazionale d'Arte di Venezia’, the ‘Venice Biennale’, an international cultural event increasingly important, and in 1935 at the ‘Quadriennale d’Arte Nazionale’, in Rome (Jasmine;Young woman resting with her cat).

The works of those years, until approximately 1946, were essentially portraits, still lives, landscapes, compositions. They highlight the distinctive elements of ORAZI's painting, which was characterized not only by its ties with the historic French Avant-gardes, but also the great names of the French Post-impressionist art. The research on colour, in the physical representation of objects and characters, takes in all those works a predominant place.

 Artistic maturity, La Peinture du Mouvement 

In the years following the war, from approximately 1947, ORAZI developed an autonomous and very original style. It was noticed ever since he exhibited, in Paris, at the third Salon de Mai, which was organized in 1947. 
At that time, amongst the artists he met in the entourage of nouvelle École de Paris, he formed deep friendship, documented since 1946 and destined to last a lifetime, with the painter, lithographer, etcher, ceramist and designer Édouard Pignon.

The French art critic Jean-Pierre Pietri called ORAZI's new style Peinture du Mouvement (Painting the Movement), for his search for dynamic and plastic effects of human gesture and animal movement, together with the strength of colours.

ORAZI's paintings caused remarkable interest in the press. They were often cited or reproduced by the influential French journal of culture and art,  ‘Les lettres Françaises‘, at that time directed by Claude Morgan: it had been founded in clandestinity, in Paris, in the years of the resistance, by Jacques Decour shot by the Germans in 1942, and whose memory remained intense in the intellectual life of Paris. For example, art critic Jean-Pierre (Pietri) published, in 1949, an article entitled “L'oeuvre d'ORAZI exprime la vie” (ORAZI's works express life) in which he made very favourable comments about two ORAZI's large compositions: Corrida (on horseback), that was exhibited at the Salon de Mai of 1949, and Bagarre à la sortie de l'usine, representing police on horseback charge at protesters outside a factory, that was to be exhibited at the Salon d'Automne of 1949. Some passages of this article must be cited: “[...] through a construction based on spirals[...] thanks to a rational repartition  of the colours[...] ORAZI forces the glance to follow on the painting a path to eternity that is the path to the creation and  development of movement[...] the movement means passion for him[...] the painting moves.”.

Other paintings - Charge des Carabiniers (Police on horseback charge at protesters), of 1949, Bagarre à la sortie de l'usine (Scuffle outside the factory), of 1950 L’enfant blessé (The injured child) of 1951- represented workers' riots so frequent in Europe at that time. In the same period, ORAZI depicted a series of paintings inspired by Roberto Rossellini's film Roma Città Aperta (Rome, Open City), about the last days of Nazi occupation of Rome, a masterpiece considered the Manifesto of Neo-realism: ORAZI's large composition Rome Ville Ouverte - which portrayed the confrontation between Rome population and the Nazis during the liberation days - was exhibited at the Salon de Mai of 1950. Furthermore, through his tempera L'Exode, very appreciated by the art critics and the press, The Exodus, ORAZI depicted a long convoy of refugees fleeing Nazi invasion: it was exhibited in Paris at the Salon d'Automne of 1952.

Amongst the paintings of the Peinture du Mouvement, the series dedicated to Circus characters (clowns, horsewomen, riders, athletes, ballet dancers) was very appreciated by the critics: those paintings were exhibited, in Paris, at the Salon de Mai in 1952 and 1953, at the Salon d'Automne and at the Deuxième Biennale de Menton in 1953, at ORAZI's solo exhibition held at the Parisian art gallery ‘Galerie Marcel Bernheim’ in 1954.

In the style of the Peinture du Mouvement there were also paintings, dated from 1948 to 1954, representing the life of peasants. In particular, in the series called Peintures sur la Barbagia (Paintings on Barbagia), or Cycle de la Sardaigne (Paintings on Sardinia) ORAZI depicted people, customs, traditions, and landscapes of Barbagia - which at that time was a remote area of Sardinia, the insular region of Italy - where he spent several months in 1953 to find wild nature and old, preserved villages with their inhabitants: twenty-five of those paintings were exhibited, in 1954, at his solo exhibition at the Parisian art gallery ‘Marcel Bernheim’; two were presented at the Salon d'Automne of 1954. Even before those exhibitions, this series of paintings had been appreciated by critics and made known by the press. Today, many paintings on Barbagia are kept by the municipality of Gavoi, to be exhibited in the local museum.

Moreover, he painted a series of large compositions representing Historic Battles (and also officers on horseback, Dragoons and Carabinieri): some of them were exhibited at the Salon de Mai of 1955 and 1956, at the Salon des Indépendants of 1957, in Paris, and at the Milanese art gallery ‘L'Annunciata’ in 1959.

In 1954, the editorial staff of the journal Les Lettres Françaises proposed to ORAZI illustrating the short-story titled The Story of a Soldier Who Brought a Cannon Home, written by the journalist and novelist Italo Calvino.

Men and Nature in Mexico. Parisian Landscapes 

ORAZI was passionate about landscapes. In the early 1950s he painted a series of French landscapes, especially in the Mediterranean region. One of these landscapes was published by the journal Les Lettres Françaises together with the verses of another of his great friends, the French poet Guillevic: a man who had participated in the first edition of the Salon de Mai, in 1945, with his poems that were published in the Exhibition Catalogue.

Then, another search (not only in painting but also photography) drove ORAZI to Mexico, where he travelled in 1955 and 1956–1957. Natural scenery, and traditions of Mexicans people were the themes of his series of paintings called Peintures sur le Mexique (Paintings on Mexico). It was exhibited in Paris in 1957, in a solo exhibition held at the art gallery ‘Galerie Vendôme’.

After he returned to France he started depicting Paris, at that time under the impact of vast demolitions (also in the district of Montparnasse) and creation of new quarters. The paintings of that series, which is called Paysages Parisiens (Parisian Landscapes), reproduce the change of the urban landscape: they consist in views of Montparnasse and Avenue du Maine - where many small streets once inhabited by artists were torn down - and, above all, of the Banks of the Seine in the new quarters of Paris scattered with building sites.
Especially the scenes on the riverbanks are full of melancholy, which is their essence: in those compositions cranes, containers, and excavators represent modern Paris, while the péniches, the old houseboats, represent historic Paris.
Some of those paintings demonstrated the artist's break away from figurative experience.
The paintings on Paris were exhibited in 1959 at the Milanese art gallery 'L’Annunciata'; some of them were reproduced in the brochure of the exhibition.

Abstract Art. The Peinture en Relief ("Painting in Relief") 

From the end of the Fifties, ORAZI turned his research and work towards abstract art, in which his great sensibility for colour would find fascinating expression. He showed his paintings at the Salon de Mai of 1960 and 1961, and above all in a solo exhibition held in Paris at the ‘Galerie 7’, in 1961. French edition of the ‘New York Herald Tribune’, for example, wrote that he  “shows succulently painted variations on single tones - gold, red, tender blue - [...]  And yet these apostrophes to pure colour do have a life on their own and a craftsmanship that delights the eye. He is one of a group of painters who are trying to put European abstractart on its feet, so that it can stand without American aid, and he may succeed.”.

Meanwhile, in the late Fifties another search dominated ORAZI's creativity. That phase (approximately 1958–1968) was characterised by his work on different kind of materials, especially natural materials and fibres, with which to create shapes in relief on the canvas surface. Shapes which were “raising” from the painting's canvas, underlined by the colours often very strong. ORAZI's work has been called Peinture en Relief (Painting in Relief). 
It was a period of great intellectual intensity. The Peinture en Relief reveals ORAZI's amazing imagination as well as his mastery of art techniques and his passion for both plasticity and colour.

At the base of ORAZI's artistic exploration there were Nature, its elements, and its phenomena (flowers, sands, stones, rocks, volcanic lava, streams, sea shores, sea beds, eruptions, storms, petrified meteorites). Regarding this aspect, it is pertinent to mention a passage written for a French fine art journal by the art critic Jean-Jacques Lévèque on ORAZI's exhibition of 1966 at the Parisian art gallery ‘Galerie du Passeur’: “With ORAZI, who exhibits at the Gallery of the Passeur[...] it is a spectacle. A natural spectacle, of the life of soil, of the harsh and poignant thrusts that structure the natural world. Knotty, convulsive shapes suddenly take hold of space and in their irresistible momentum blossom beyond the limits imposed by the paintings' frame.”.

ORAZI's works were, at first, in low relief. One of them, Été (Summer), has been exhibited at the Salon de Mai of 1962, not only in Paris but also in Tokyo, Osaka, and Yawata. Then, the relief became progressively higher, and the shapes extended beyond the limits of the canvas and chassis. They have been annually exhibited at the Salon de Mai, in Paris, from 1962 to 1979, as well as in other exhibitions in France and Europe, among which the ORAZI's solo exhibition of 1966 at the art gallery 'Galerie du Passeur', in Paris. A drawing of the work by ORAZI entitled Alpha-Oméga was reproduced on the invitation brochure to the 1966 exhibition; Alpha-Oméga would also have been exhibited at the Salon de Mai of 1971.

The critic of the time was very positive, as expressed in an article written by the French art critic Raoul-Jean Moulin: “[...] the painter puts under test the stone, the plant, the air, the light[...] Natural materials, harsh and whirling, streams of eruptive lava, petrified meteorites[...] moments in the formation of the universe.”; or as in Georges Boudaille's: “Matter is embossed, rises now like the earth’s crust, now like petals of flowers; forms proliferate and leave the limits of the frame to invade space[...] there are lands, but also volcanic lava, tree barks, rocks, mountains.”.

Quite often Paintings in Relief demonstrate ORAZIs tendency to create circular shapes on canvas surface. A tendency that would become fundamental in the next artistic phase (1970-1977), called Ligne Circulaire (Circular Line), in which the artist break away from the work in relief.

Circular Line, Landscape-Heads, and Imaginary Landscapes 

In the series of paintings Ligne Circulaire - from 1970 to 1977 - which coincides with the final decade of ORAZI's life, there is no more reference to the powerful natural events; paintings reproduce the dimension of harmony of the universe, the birth and movements of its planets, the vastness of its firmaments. The colours are rich and tender at the same time.

Moreover, in some paintings ORAZI depicted astonishing representations of Mother Earth that embraces her creatures (insects, birds and flowers), or of the Moon, whose charming face is divided into different landscapes. Finally, a group of paintings called Têtes-Paysage (Landscape-Heads) should be mentioned. In these paintings ORAZI created mysterious human heads, or of fauns and mythological characters, which, however, form a sort of natural landscapes.

ORAZI was also a writer. In 1974, his tale - written at the beginning of the 70s - was published in Paris. He represented the main character of his tale in a Painting in Relief exhibited in 1973, at the Salon International d'Arts Plastiques in Toulon, and then in a painting in the style of Landscape-Heads, which appears on the cover of the 1974 book.

Paintings of the Ligne Circulaire and Têtes-Paysage have been exhibited in Paris, in 1980, at the solo exhibition organised a year after ORAZI's death at the ‘Galerie 222’.

The landscape - in all its components - is a dimension that continued to remain essential for ORAZI, from his youth until his final years, when he created a small group of paintings, between 1977 and early days of 1979, when he was in poor health, called Paysages de l'Imaginaire'' (Imaginary Landscapes). The landscapes of this series are made up of gentle hills, illuminated by a soft lighting, and painted in simple lines and shapes, with delicate colours. They are the last paintings of ORAZI.

References 

1906 births
1979 deaths
20th-century French painters